Tohumluk is a highland village of Alucra district of the Giresun Province of Turkey. Its population is 67 (2021).

References 

Villages in Alucra District